Air India Express Flight 1344 was a scheduled international flight on 7 August 2020 from Dubai, United Arab Emirates, to Kozhikode, India, landing at Calicut International Airport. The flight was part of the Vande Bharat Mission to repatriate Indian nationals stranded due to the COVID-19 pandemic. The flight crew aborted two landing attempts because of heavy rain and tailwind. On the third landing attempt, the aircraft touched down on runway 10, but skidded off the end of the tabletop runway and slid down a  slope, killing 19 passengers and both pilots. The four cabin crew members and 165 passengers survived, of whom all but two were injured. This was the second fatal accident involving Air India Express, after the 2010 Mangalore crash.

Background

Airport 
Calicut International Airport in Karipur, Malappuram, is considered one of the most dangerous airports in India, according to India's Directorate General of Civil Aviation (DGCA). It has a tabletop runway, a runway that is located on the top of a plateau or hill with one or both ends adjacent to a steep precipice which drops into a gorge. The DGCA designated Calicut Airport as a "critical airfield", which means that only the captain (and not the first officer) can perform takeoffs and landings there. The Airports Authority of India says that the airport is licensed for use in all weather conditions under instrument flight rules, but that the pilots operating flights to and from Calicut Airport (both day and night) should have sufficient flying hours at night to handle the dangerous conditions.

Captain Mohan Ranganathan, a member of a safety advisory committee of the Ministry of Civil Aviation, said in 2011 that Calicut Airport is "unsafe". He recommended that Calicut Airport not be used for landing during wet weather. He observed that the airport had a tabletop runway with a steep down-slope from one-third of the runway 10 and inadequate "buffer zones", referring to the runway end safety areas (RESA) at both ends of the runway. Instead of the recommended  safety area, it had only . Calicut Airport also lacked an engineered materials arrestor system (EMAS), which could have prevented the accident. He also reported that there were heavy rubber deposits on the runway. Calicut Airport's management ignored several warnings about the dangerous conditions at Calicut Airport, especially during wet conditions. Many international airlines stopped landing wide-body aircraft at Calicut because of the dangerous conditions. Ranganathan said "The warnings were ignored... in my opinion, it is not an accident but a murder. Their own audits have had flagged safety issues".

Conditions at Calicut Airport were investigated in 2019, following a tailstrike during the landing of Air India Express aircraft. The investigation revealed several safety hazards, including multiple cracks in the runways, pools of stagnant water, and excessive rubber deposits. In July 2019, the DGCA issued a show-cause notice to the director of Calicut Airport because of these hazards.

Aircraft and crew 
The accident involved a Boeing 737-800 with a short-field performance package, registered as VT-AXH, manufacturer's serial number 36323 and line number 2108. The aircraft, that first flew on 15 November 2006, was operated by Air India Express and had a tail livery with India Gate on the left and Gateway of India on the right. The crew consisted of Captain Deepak Sathe (59), first officer Akhilesh Kumar (32); and four flight attendants. Sathe had landed successfully at Calicut airport at least 27 times, including more than ten times in 2020. He had 10,000 hours of flying experience on the Boeing 737, including 6,662 as commander.

Crash 
It was a repatriation flight for people who had been stranded abroad due to the COVID-19 pandemic, under the Vande Bharat Mission.

The aircraft reached the airport on schedule. The approach was for runway 28, but two landings were aborted due to tailwind and the aircraft circled, waiting for clearance before making a landing on runway 10. At around 19:37 IST (14:07 UTC), they were given clearance to land on runway 10. Runway 28 was operational and in the first landing attempt, the pilot could not see the runway thus requested for runway 10. On the second attempt on  runway 10, the aircraft touched down near taxiway ''C'', which is approximately  beyond the runway threshold. The aircraft failed to stop before the end of the tabletop runway and plunged  into a gorge, splitting the fuselage into two sections upon impact. No post-crash fire was reported. It was suggested that the crew shut off the engines on landing, which may have saved lives by preventing a fire. According to a CISF officer, the aircraft did not slide into the gorge. It took off from the cliff and then collapsed.

The accident was the second fatal accident of Air India Express and was similar to Air India Express Flight 812 which also overran the runway 10 years earlier at Mangalore International Airport, killing 158 people on board.

Victims 
A total of 184 passengers, four cabin crew and two cockpit crew were on board, all Indian. Seventeen people died on-spot from the crash, including both pilots. Later the death toll rose to twenty-one people on 24 August. and more than 100 people were injured. The chief minister of Maharashtra, Uddhav Thackeray, announced a state funeral for late Wing commander Captain Deepak Vasant Sathe in Mumbai.

Compensation 
It was also announced that the medical expenses of the injured would be borne by the state government.

Air India Express completed the disbursement of interim compensation to all passengers and next of kin of the deceased passengers soon after the accident.

Aftermath

Rescue and response 
Following the incident, local people from the surrounding Karipur village rushed to the crash site to rescue trapped victims from the aircraft, followed by 40 Central Industrial Security Force (CISF) personnel who were guarding the perimeter of the airport, a quick reaction team and the Chief Airport Security Officer. Family members of the CISF personnel living nearby also joined. Police and firefighters were also deployed for the initial rescue operations. All passengers were evacuated in about three hours and taken to various hospitals in Kozhikode and Malappuram districts. Emergency response team, GO Team and special assistance team of Air India (officially known as 'Angels of Air India') from Kochi, Mumbai and Delhi were sent to the accident site. Three CISF officers were awarded Director General commendation disc for their rescue efforts after the mishap. The accident is predicted to cost the insurers and their reinsurers , which includes aircraft or hull and liability for third party and passengers. It is around 90 per cent of the insured value and Air India will recover this amount since the aircraft has been totally damaged. The insurer is an Indian insurance consortium led by New India Assurance. Claim settlement survey has already started. The airline had engaged a US-based firm, Kenyon International, to recover the baggage along with Angels of Air India.

COVID-19 infection 
Two passengers on the flight who survived tested positive for COVID-19, after arriving at a hospital after the accident. To check the spread among other passengers and rescue personnel, CISF and Kerala Health Department asked their personnel and other passengers who were on the flight to undertake testing and quarantine. One week later, 24 officers involved in the rescue operation tested positive. Kondotty municipality, the place where the airport is located, was subsequently declared as a containment zone.

Pilots associations' response 
The International Federation of Air Line Pilots' Associations (IFALPA) tightly monitored the actions after the accident and responded "Our thoughts are with the families of the pilots, crew members, and passengers who lost their lives aboard the aircraft. We send support and wishes to all the survivors, many of them injured and in hospital in critical condition." They got in touch with the Indian association, Air Line Pilots’ Association-India (ALPA-India) and the Aircraft Accident Investigation Bureau (AAIB) for technical expertise and assistance in investigation.

Following the accident, many pilot associations in the country soared up against the director of the DGCA, Arun Kumar, and wanted him to be replaced with someone more technically sound in aviation, after he referred to the late pilots as "fellows” and also said, "...and the landing it seems was not appropriate...", "The landing was not smooth". The pilot associations pointed that these comments from the director were amateurish and made them "the laughing stock of the aviation world".

Public interest litigation 
According to Yeshwant Shenoy, a lawyer fighting for safer airports in India, the DGCA should have put restrictions on conditions when airlines could land or take off. He blamed the DGCA for being incompetent and negligent after the 2010 crash in Mangalore, and called it a state-run syndicate. He filed a Public Interest Litigation (PIL) in the Kerala High Court after the crash, to shut down operations of Calicut airport as it is not compliant with air regulations. Shenoy demanded for an open inquiry by a Court of Inquiry instead of a closed one by AAIB. He also demanded that the investigation should be conducted by the Central Bureau of Investigation as local police weren't experienced in these.

Investigation 
The Directorate General of Civil Aviation (DGCA) and Flight Safety Departments  investigated the accident. The cockpit voice recorder and flight data recorder were recovered the next day and sent to Delhi for analysis. Boeing was to send its investigation team to examine the debris of the aircraft for defects and assist the probe.

The throttle was found to be in a fully forward position (takeoff or go-around position) and the spoilers were retracted from the position of the speed brake lever, which indicates that the pilots might have tried for a go-around. The tailwind, rubber deposits and wet runway affecting the braking performance of the aircraft are thought to be contributory factors to the accident. Civil Aviation Minister, Hardeep Puri, in a press conference at Kozhikode on 8 August, said that there had been sufficient fuel onboard for the aircraft to have flown to a diversion airport. The possibility of pilot error as a cause of the accident was suggested by DGCA's Arun Kumar.

Several concerns were raised on the inquiry on this incident, by Captain Mohan Ranganathan, Yeshwant Shenoy and others, that it might get covered up and the truth would never surface. Royal Aeronautical Society fellow and aviation safety expert Amit Singh alleged that evidence in the crash site was being tampered, as few unidentified people were spotted near the wreckage, thus asked for an open investigation. He also pointed out that investigations were flawed and instead of punishing real culprits, actions were taken against the pilots.

Aircraft Accident Investigation Bureau (AAIB)
The AAIB team in Kozhikode probed the incident with the assistance of Airports Authority of India officials, air traffic control, ground staff, CISF, the fire team and the rescue team. It found evidence of waterlogging of the runway at the time of landing. It also checked whether ATC was aware of waterlogging and whether the pilots adhered to rules. The preliminary investigation report was expected to be ready in a week after the accident, however this did not happen.
The United States National Transportation Safety Board (NTSB) also sent a member to assist the AAIB.

A five-member committee was set up by AAIB on 13 August, to investigate the incident, with the final report to be submitted on 13 January 2021. The committee headed by Captain S.S. Chahar, former designated examiner on Boeing 737 Next Generation, was to also provide recommendations to avoid such accidents in future.
The civil aviation ministry cited delays due to the COVID-19 pandemic and granted a two-month extension to the AAIB to submit its draft final probe report on the crash.

The report was released on September 11, 2021, where it said that the probable cause of the accident was "the non-adherence to standard operating procedures by the pilot flying". The pilot in command did not do a Go Around despite the call for it by the co-pilot, who also failed to take over the controls.

Ban on wide-body aircraft 
Shortly after the crash, operations of wide-body aircraft at Kozhikode were put on hold. As a result, Etihad and Saudia removed their services to Calicut.

In popular culture 
Vande Bharat Flight IX 1344: Hope to Survival is a 2021 Discovery+ original documentary based on the crash. The 45-minute documentary creates graphical simulations of the accident.

See also 

 Air India Express Flight 812 another Boeing 737-8NG(SFP), which overshot the runway in Mangalore International Airport, Mangalore, India
 List of accidents and incidents involving commercial aircraft
 List of accidents and incidents involving the Boeing 737
 Pegasus Airlines Flight 2193 a Boeing 737-86J, which overran the runway at Istanbul Sabiha Gökçen International Airport, Pendik, Istanbul, Turkey. Three died.
 TAM Airlines Flight 3054 an Airbus A320, which overshot the runway at Congonhas Airport, situated in Brazil
 Air France Flight 358 an Airbus A340, which overran the runway at Toronto Pearson International Airport in August, 2005

Explanatory notes

References

External links 

 IX 1344 incident at Kozhikode – UPDATES —Air India Express
 Accident Bulletin: AIXL Flight IX-1344—Air India

2020 in India
Accidents and incidents involving the Boeing 737 Next Generation
Express Flight 1344
August 2020 events in India
Aviation accidents and incidents in 2020
Aviation accidents and incidents in India
Airliner accidents and incidents caused by pilot error
Airliner accidents and incidents involving runway overruns
COVID-19 pandemic in India
COVID-19 pandemic in the United Arab Emirates
Evacuations of Indians
History of Kozhikode
Transport in Kozhikode